Trentham is the most populous suburb of Upper Hutt, a city in the Wellington region of New Zealand. The suburb is located in a widening of the Hutt Valley, five kilometres to the southwest of the Upper Hutt city centre.

The suburb includes the Trentham Racecourse, the base of the Wellington Racing Club, the site of Hutt International Boys' School, and the Trentham Railway Station.

The Trentham Military Camp was used extensively for training soldiers in preparation for World War I and World War II. It is still a base for the New Zealand Defence Force.

A General Motors-Holden assembly plant operated in Trentham between 1967 and 1990.

History

The area was settled in the 1840s.

The name "Trentham" was initially given by Richard Barton, the first European Settler in the area, in honour of his former employer, the Duke of Sutherland. One of the Duke of Sutherland's subsidiary titles was Viscount Trentham, of Trentham in the County of Stafford.

The Barton family memory lives on in the area, with Barton Road, Barton Avenue and an area of native trees called Barton's Bush, which is within the reserve now known as Trentham Memorial Park. Richard Barton was interred in the grounds of St John's Church, and there are also memorials to him in the form of brass plaques within the Church building.

Demographics

Trentham had a population of 9,606 at the 2018 New Zealand census, an increase of 1,077 people (12.6%) since the 2013 census, and an increase of 1,341 people (16.2%) since the 2006 census. There were 3,330 households. There were 5,040 males and 4,560 females, giving a sex ratio of 1.11 males per female, with 1,674 people (17.4%) aged under 15 years, 2,010 (20.9%) aged 15 to 29, 4,308 (44.8%) aged 30 to 64, and 1,614 (16.8%) aged 65 or older.

Ethnicities were 72.7% European/Pākehā, 21.1% Māori, 7.2% Pacific peoples, 10.7% Asian, and 3.3% other ethnicities (totals add to more than 100% since people could identify with multiple ethnicities).

The proportion of people born overseas was 21.2%, compared with 27.1% nationally.

Although some people objected to giving their religion, 44.3% had no religion, 39.3% were Christian, 2.6% were Hindu, 0.7% were Muslim, 1.1% were Buddhist and 5.1% had other religions.

Of those at least 15 years old, 1,317 (16.6%) people had a bachelor or higher degree, and 1,563 (19.7%) people had no formal qualifications. The employment status of those at least 15 was that 3,618 (45.6%) people were employed full-time, 888 (11.2%) were part-time, and 363 (4.6%) were unemployed.

Education

Brentwood School, a co-educational state primary school for year 1 to 6 students, opened in 1955 to deal with the overflow from Trentham School. The school was closed in 2004 and merged with Trentham School.

It was founded in 1962.

It was founded in 1991.

References

Suburbs of Upper Hutt
Populated places on Te Awa Kairangi / Hutt River